Middletown is a neighborhood located north of Little Italy (Downtown San Diego), south of Mission Hills and Hillcrest, east of San Diego International Airport, and west of Bankers Hill. Interstate 5 passes through this neighborhood and San Diego Trolley has one station in this neighborhood.

References

Neighborhoods in San Diego
Urban communities in San Diego